Tauopathy belongs to a class of neurodegenerative diseases involving the aggregation of tau protein into neurofibrillary or gliofibrillary tangles in the human brain. Tangles are formed by hyperphosphorylation of the microtubule protein known as tau, causing the protein to dissociate from microtubules and form insoluble aggregates. (These aggregations are also called paired helical filaments.) The mechanism of tangle formation is not well understood, and whether tangles are a primary cause of Alzheimer's disease or play a peripheral role is unknown.

Detection and imaging
Post-mortem Tau tangles are seen microscopically in stained brain samples.

Pre-mortem In living patients tau tangle locations can be imaged with a PET scan using a suitable radio-emissive agent.

Alzheimer's disease 

Neurofibrillary tangles were first described by Alois Alzheimer in one of his patients with Alzheimer's disease (AD). The tangles are  considered a secondary tauopathy. AD is also classified as an amyloidosis because of the presence of senile plaques.

When tau becomes hyperphosphorylated, the protein dissociates from the microtubules in axons. Then, tau becomes misfolded and the protein begins to aggregate, which eventually forms the neurofibrillary tangles seen in Alzheimer's patients. Microtubules also destabilize when tau is dissociated. The combination of the neurofibrillary tangles and destabilized microtubules result in disruption of processes such as axonal transport and neural communication.

The degree of NFT involvement in AD is defined by Braak stages. Braak stages I and II are used when NFT involvement is confined mainly to the transentorhinal region of the brain, stages III and IV when there is also involvement of limbic regions such as the hippocampus, and V and VI when there's extensive neocortical involvement. This should not be confused with the degree of senile plaque involvement, which progresses differently.

Other diseases 
 Primary age-related tauopathy (PART) dementia, with NFTs similar to AD, but without amyloid plaques.
 Chronic traumatic encephalopathy (CTE)
 Progressive supranuclear palsy (PSP)
 Corticobasal degeneration (CBD)
 Frontotemporal dementia and parkinsonism linked to chromosome 17 (FTDP-17)
 Vacuolar tauopathy
 Lytico-bodig disease (Parkinson-dementia complex of Guam)
 Ganglioglioma and gangliocytoma
 Meningioangiomatosis
 Postencephalitic parkinsonism
 Subacute sclerosing panencephalitis (SSPE)
 As well as lead encephalopathy, tuberous sclerosis, pantothenate kinase-associated neurodegeneration, and lipofuscinosis

In both Pick's disease and corticobasal degeneration, tau proteins are deposited as inclusion bodies within swollen or "ballooned" neurons.

Argyrophilic grain disease (AGD), another type of dementia, is marked by an abundance of argyrophilic grains and coiled bodies upon microscopic examination of brain tissue.  Some consider it to be a type of Alzheimer's disease. It may co-exist with other tauopathies such as progressive supranuclear palsy and corticobasal degeneration, and also Pick's disease.

Tauopathies are often overlapped with synucleinopathies, possibly due to interaction between the synuclein and tau proteins.

The non-Alzheimer's tauopathies are sometimes grouped together as "Pick's complex" due to their association with frontotemporal dementia, or frontotemporal lobar degeneration.

See also 
 Proteopathy

References

External links 

Dementia
Medical signs
Histopathology
Cytoskeletal defects